Delcroix is a French surname derived from de la Croix ("of the Cross"). Notable people with the surname include:

Catherine Delcroix (born 1955), French sociologist
 (1894-1982), German actor
Leo Delcroix (born 1949), Belgian politician
Ludo Delcroix (born 1950), Belgian cyclist
 (born 1967), French writer and journalist
Patrick Delcroix (born 1963), French dancer and choreographer
Tobias Delcroix (born 1997), French photographer

See also
Decroix
de la Croix
Delacroix

French-language surnames